Eleutherospermum is a genus of flowering plants belonging to the family Apiaceae. Its only species is Eleutherospermum cicutarium. Its native range is Western Asia to the Caucasus.

References

Apioideae
Monotypic Apioideae genera
Taxa named by Karl Koch